Colin Free (1 September 1925–26 May 1996) was an Australian writer best known for his work in TV.

Colin Free was born on 1 September 1925 in Sydney, Australia. He died on 26 May 1996 in Goulburn, Australia.

He wrote for the theatre, notably Hamlet in shadow – Sydney in 1954.

Free wrote scripts for the BBC and the ABC, as well as for radio.

Selected awards 
 Australian Writer's Guild (AWGIE), 1977 – Best TV series episode, Rush (Television) – "A shilling a day"
 Logie Award 1977, Best script- Rush (Television)
 SAMMIE Award 1977-Best writer for a television series, Rush (Television)
 Logie Award 1979, Bit part (Television Drama)
 Logie Award- 1984, 1985, 1986-A Country Practice (Television)

Selected credits
How Do You Spell Matrimony? (1965)
Contrabandits (1967–68)
Timelapse (TV series) (1980)
All the Rivers Run (1983)

References

External links

Colin Free at Austlit

1925 births
1996 deaths
Australian writers
Logie Award winners